Patrick Delany (1686 – 6 May 1768), was an Irish clergyman and described by A Compendium of Irish Biography as "an eloquent preacher, a man of wit and learning."

Biography
He was educated at Trinity College Dublin (which he entered as a sizar), was elected a Scholar, and eventually rose to be a Senior Fellow. He became well known as a preacher at Saint Werburgh's, attracting the attention of Lord Carteret, then Lord Lieutenant of Ireland. Delany's Toryism resulted in clashes with the provost of Trinity, Richard Baldwin, who eventually forced Delany to resign from the college. Exchanging the Fellowship for the office of Chancellor of Christ Church, Dublin impoverished him in the late 1720s, but in 1731 he married Mrs Margaret Tenison, widow of Richard Tenison: "a rich Irish widow, and again found himself in a position to gratify his hospitable disposition and indulge his literary tastes".

References

External links
 Patrick Delany at the Eighteenth-Century Poetry Archive (ECPA)
 Works by Patrick Delaney on the Internet Archive

1686 births
1768 deaths
Alumni of Trinity College Dublin
Fellows of Trinity College Dublin
Irish writers
Christian clergy from Dublin (city)
18th-century Irish clergy
Scholars of Trinity College Dublin